Shambhu Mishtry (born 15 November 1988) is an Indian professional footballer who plays as a goalkeeper for Rangdajied United F.C. in the I-League.

Career

Rangdajied United
Mishtry made his professional debut for Rangdajied in the I-League on 29 September 2013 against Bengaluru FC at the Bangalore Football Stadium and played the whole match; as Rangdajied lost the match 3–0.

Career statistics

References

1988 births
Living people
Footballers from Kolkata
Indian footballers
Rangdajied United F.C. players
I-League players
Association football goalkeepers
Pune FC players
Air India FC players
NEROCA FC players
Real Kashmir FC players
Calcutta Football League players